The United Church in Solomon Islands is a Reformed congregational Christian denomination in Solomon Islands.

History
The first Australian missionaries were sent to the Solomon Islands archipelago in 1902 by the Methodist Missionary Society. The Methodists expanded mission in the Western Islands, Munda Point and Bougainville. Later, in 1968 the Methodist church united in Papua New Guinea and the Solomon Islands, to form the United Church in Papua New Guinea and the Solomon Islands. The Bougainville congregations straddled the political divide. In the Western Solomon Islands the London Missionary Society gained majority. It was an agreement between the Methodists and the LMS people. The United Church acquired people of Reformed background too. After independence, the area became known as the sovereign nation of Solomon Islands. In 1978, a movement in Bougainville seeking secession from Papua New Guinea disrupted communication with within the church. Half of the church in Solomon Islands and in Papua New Guinea separated from the Church in 1996. The church in Solomon Islands maintains connections with the World Council of Churches, Pacific Conference of Churches.

Statistics
It has 50,000 members and 300 congregations.

Interchurch relationships
Member of the World Communion of Reformed Churches, the World Council of Churches and the Council for World Mission.

References

Members of the World Communion of Reformed Churches
Churches in the Solomon Islands